The 2013 Big 12 Conference baseball tournament will be held from May 22 through 26 at Chickasaw Bricktown Ballpark in Oklahoma City, Oklahoma.  The annual tournament determines the conference champion of the Division I Big 12 Conference for college baseball.  The winner of the event earns the league's automatic bid to the 2013 NCAA Division I baseball tournament.

The tournament has been held since 1997, the inaugural year of the Big 12 Conference.  Among current league members, Texas has won the most championships with four.  TCU and West Virginia, new members of the league, are eligible for their first tournaments.  Only Baylor and Kansas State have never won the event.  Iowa State discontinued their program after the 2001 season without having won a title.  Last year's champion, Missouri and three time champion Texas A&M departed the conference for the Southeastern Conference after the 2012 season.

Fourth-seeded Oklahoma defeated sixth-seeded Kansas in the championship game to claim their second Big 12 Baseball Conference Tournament title.

Format and seeding
Due to the 2013 Moore tornado, just outside the Oklahoma City site of the Tournament, the Big 12 announced a delay in the start of the event and a change in format from the planned double-elimination tournament.  Instead, the eight teams will be divided into two pools who will play a round-robin format.  The winners of each pool will then play a single championship game.

Results

All-Tournament Team

Most Outstanding Player
Jon Gray

References

Tournament
Big 12 Conference Baseball Tournament
Big 12 Conference baseball tournament
Big 12 Conference baseball tournament
Baseball competitions in Oklahoma City
College sports tournaments in Oklahoma